Gyraulus riparius is a species of small freshwater snail, an aquatic pulmonate gastropod mollusk in the family Planorbidae, the ram's horn snails.

Distribution
The distribution of this species is Holarctic:
 Germany - critically endangered (vom Aussterben bedroht)
 Netherlands

Habitat
This small snail lives on water plants in freshwater.

Shell description
The  shell is nearly planispiral in its coiling.

References

rip
Molluscs of Europe